Noctuides thurivora is a species of snout moth in the genus Noctuides. It is known from Sri Lanka (including Galle, the type location).

References

Moths described in 1932
Epipaschiinae